Ptyonius is an extinct genus of nectridean lepospondyl within the family Urocordylidae.

Prehistoric amphibians of North America
Carboniferous amphibians
Extinct amphibians
Holospondyls